The Las Vegas Country Club is a private membership club located in the Winchester area of metropolitan Las Vegas, Nevada.

History
It was built on the site of a 1950s horse and automobile racetrack named Las Vegas Park and later the Las Vegas Park Speedway. It was developed by businessmen Moe Dalitz, Allard Roen, Irwin Molasky and Merv Adelson.

The 18-hole golf course was completed in the fall of 1967, followed by the completion of a  clubhouse in April 1968. The clubhouse architect was Julian Gabrielle; the golf course designer was Edmond B. Ault. Amenities include two pitching and chipping greens, a  putting green, Indoor and outdoor tennis courts, racquetball, swimming pool and a complete exercise facility.

The club served as the host for the Las Vegas Invitational golf tournament between 1983 and 1991, and also hosted events on a rotational basis from 1992–1995. The club also hosted the LPGA Takefuji Classic on the LPGA Tour from 2003 to 2006.

The club was sold in 2018 to Samick Music Corp.

References

Further reading

External links

Buildings and structures in Winchester, Nevada
Golf clubs and courses in Nevada
Golf in Las Vegas